A special election to the United States House of Representatives for  was held to determine the successor to John Boehner, who resigned his seat on October 31, 2015. Republican Governor of Ohio John Kasich set the primary election for March 15, 2016, and the general election for June 7. The winner of the June special election ran for reelection in November 2016 but served the remainder of Boehner's 13th two-year term, which ended in early January 2017.

Republican primary
Before John Boehner announced his retirement in October 2015, J. D. Winteregg and Eric Gurr both entered the race during the summer with the intention of challenging Boehner. After Boehner's retirement, over twenty Republicans pulled a petition with the Board of Elections to run for the vacant seat. Butler County Auditor Roger Reynolds was considered the front-runner for the nomination but surprised everyone when he suspended his campaign for the seat in December 2015.

Candidates
 Matthew Ashworth
 Bill Beagle, state senator
 Warren Davidson, businessman
 Tim Derickson, state representative
 Scott George, human resources executive
 Eric J. Haemmerle, high school government teacher
 Terri King, attorney
 Joseph Matvey
 Edward R. Meer
 John W. Robbins
 Michael Smith
 Jim Spurlino, businessman
 Kevin F. White, airline pilot and retired USAF officer
 J. D. Winteregg, former adjunct French instructor and candidate in 2014
 George Wooley

Withdrawn
 Eric Gurr, businessman and candidate in 2014
 Roger Reynolds, Butler County Auditor

Declined
 Bill Coley, state senator
 Joe Deters, Hamilton County Prosecutor and former Ohio State Treasurer
 Keith Faber, President of the Ohio Senate
 Richard K. Jones, Butler County Sheriff
 Wes Retherford, state representative
 Lee Wong, West Chester Township Trustee

Endorsements

Results

Democratic primary
Corey Foister, founder of Next Generation America, a nonprofit organization dedicated to getting more young people involved in government. He is a stage-IV cancer survivor of neuroblastoma. At age 25, he is currently the youngest candidate in America to win the nomination of a major U.S. political party for United States Congress.

Candidates

Declared
 Corey Foister, nonprofit owner & digital content creator

Declined
 Connie Pillich, former state representative and nominee for Ohio State Treasurer in 2014
 Tom Poetter, professor and nominee in 2014
 P.G. Sittenfeld, Cincinnati City Councilman (ran for U.S. Senate)
 Jerry Springer, talk show host, former mayor of Cincinnati, nominee for OH-02 in 1970 and candidate for governor in 1982

Results

Green primary
James J. Condit, Jr., a frequent candidate for public office as a member of the Constitution Party, ran unopposed for the Green Party's nomination. Due to his controversial remarks on Jewish Americans belief that the September 11 attacks were an inside job, his candidacy was disavowed by the Green Party of Ohio.

Candidates
 James J. Condit, Jr., perennial candidate

Results

General election

Candidates
Warren Davidson (R), businessman
Corey Foister (D), nonprofit owner  
James J. Condit, Jr. (G), perennial candidate

Endorsements

Results

See also
 List of special elections to the United States House of Representatives
 Speaker of the United States House of Representatives election, October 2015

References

External links
 Matthew Ashworth for Congress
 Bill Beagle for Congress
 Jim Condit, Jr. for Congress
 Warren Davidson for Congress
 Tim Derickson for Congress
 Corey Foister for Congress
 Scott George for Congress
 Eric Haemmerle for Congress
 Terri King for Congress
 Jim Spurlino for Congress
 Kevin White for Congress
 J.D. Winteregg for Congress

2016 Ohio elections
2016 08
Ohio 2016 08
Ohio 2016 08
Ohio 08
United States House of Representatives 2016 08
Ohio 08